The Idiot is a novel by Fyodor Dostoevsky.

The Idiot  may also refer to:

Film and television
The Idiot, a 1914 drama film starring Robert Harron
The Idiots, a 1998 Danish film by Lars von Trier

Adapted from the Dostoevsky novel

The Idiot (1946 film), a 1946 French film by Georges Lamoin
The Idiot (1951 film), a 1951 Japanese film by Akira Kurosawa
The Idiot (1958 film), a 1958 Russian film by Ivan Pyryev
The Idiot (TV series), a 2003 Russian television series
The Idiot (2011 film), a 2011 Estonian film by Rainer Sarnet

Other fiction
 "The Idiots" (short story), a short story by Joseph Conrad
 The Idiot (Batuman novel), a novel by Elif Batuman

Music
The Idiot (album), a 1977 album by Iggy Pop
The Idiot (opera), an opera by Mieczyslaw Weinberg, adapted from the Dostoevsky novel.
"The Idiot" (song), a song by Stan Rogers

Other uses
"The Idiots", a self-deprecating nickname for the 2004 Boston Red Sox

See also
Idiot (disambiguation)